Julia Alcayde y Montoya (1885–1939) was a Spanish painter who specialised in painting still lifes and portraits.

Biography
Alcayde y Montoya was born in 1885 in Gijón. She exhibited regularly at the Spanish National Exhibition of Fine Arts where she won third place medals in 1892 and 1895, and second place medals in 1899, 1912 and 1920. Alcayde y Montoya exhibited  her work at the Palace of Fine Arts and The Woman's Building at the 1893 World's Columbian Exposition in Chicago, Illinois.

Alcayde y Montoya died in 1939 in Madrid.

Gallery

References

External links
 images of Alcayde y Montoya's paintings on artNET

1885 births
1939 deaths
Spanish artists
Spanish women painters
19th-century Spanish women artists
20th-century Spanish women artists
19th-century Spanish painters
20th-century Spanish painters